Dual control is the situation in which a national government agrees to share control of its country with representatives of foreign governments, called controllers, because it is indebted to them.

Examples
Egypt, which was indebted to European powers after the completion of the Suez Canal and thus forced to accept controllers in its government in the 1870s.

See also
Dual power, in which a revolutionary force attempts to provide alternative government services

References

Marxist theory